Interrogating the Witnesses is a 1987 East German drama film directed by Gunther Scholz. It was entered into the 15th Moscow International Film Festival.

Cast
 René Steinke as Max
 Mario Gericke as Rainer
 Anne Kasprik as Viola (as Anne Kasprzik)
 Christine Schorn as Beate Klapproth
 Franz Viehmann as Gunnar Strach
 Gudrun Okras as Oma Lotte

References

External links
 

1987 films
1987 drama films
German drama films
East German films
1980s German-language films
1980s German films